Ervino Alessandro Pedro Soares (born 30 May 1999) or simply Ervino, is a football player who currently plays for Timor-Leste national football team.

International career
Ervino made his senior international debut in an 8-0 loss against United Arab Emirates national football team in the 2018 FIFA World Cup qualification on 12 November 2015.

References

1999 births
Living people
East Timorese footballers
Timor-Leste international footballers
Association football defenders